The Ministry of Environmental Protection (HaMisrad LeHaganat HaSviva) is a government ministry in Israel.  It was formerly known as the Ministry of the Environment (HaMisrad LeEikhut HaSviva).

The ministry operates on three levels: national, regional and local: At the national level it is responsible for the formulation of a nationwide integrated, and inclusive policy for the protection of the environment. At the regional level, through its six districts, the ministry, among others, oversees the implementation of the national environmental policy, engages in local planning processes, assists municipalities with their environmental responsibilities and supervise them when formulating requirements for the acquisition of business licenses. At the local level the ministry lends support to environmental units and towns associations that have been established in municipalities throughout the country.

Climate Change is a major area in which the ministry operates. The prime objective of the ministry in this area is to reduce the emissions of greenhouse gases (GHG) from all sources in the Israeli economy. In the run-up to the UNFCCC convention in Paris in 2015 the ministry has led an inter-ministerial committee that examined a range of GHG emissions reduction targets for 2030 and formulated the strategy for meeting these targets. The ministry is also responsible for preparing and submitting Israel's different Climate Change reports to the UNFCCC. The ministry focuses its activities on policies and measures to promote renewable energy, switch from coal to natural gas in the power sector and to ramp up the implementation of energy efficiency measures across the economy.

A basic volunteer for the ministry is called a "Ne'eman Nikayon", translated literally as a "clean trustee" but more accurately described as a volunteer cleanliness protection officer. They are certified under the "Cleanliness protection law of 1984". A volunteer must pass a one-day course where they learn the basic laws involved in their ability to report violations of Israeli littering laws. Once certified, a volunteer can write out tickets against violators and submit them directly to the ministry for processing.  In almost all cases a simple fine is issued (ranging from 250–8000 Israeli new sheqels), but under some circumstances the case may be sent automatically to a judge (especially in the case of a repeat offender) to determine special punishment.

The environmental protection ministry has paid inspectors (Pakachim) who serve in a similar capacity as a basic volunteer, as well as holding additional powers according to Israeli law.

List of ministers
The Environmental Protection Minister of Israel (Sar LeHaganat HaSviva) is the political head of the ministry. The post was created on 22 December 1988, and until May 2006 was known as the Minister of the Environment (Sar LeEikhut HaSviva). There have been Deputy Ministers on multiple occasions.

Deputy ministers

References

External links
Ministry of Environmental Protection
All Ministers in the Ministry of the Environment Knesset website

Environmental
Ministry of Environmental Protection
Environmental